Jon Dette (born April 19, 1970) is an American heavy metal drummer best known for his time in Slayer and Testament. Over the years, he has also been chosen to fill-in with Anthrax, Heathen, and Iced Earth. Dette also played with Evildead and Impellitteri for several years.

Early life 
Dette was born in San Diego, California on April 19, 1970. He started playing drums at age 14. In 1984, his parents got divorced. He asked both of them for a drum set, which led to him receiving two drum kits for his birthday, which he converted into a double bass kit. The same birthday, his younger brother got him a copy of Anthrax's Fistful of Metal, which led him to discovering bands similar to Anthrax, such as Metallica and Slayer. By 1990, Dette joined the band Apocalypse, which ended up being short-lived. Dette joined the thrash metal act Evildead in 1993. With the band, he recorded a single demo, titled Terror, until his departure in 1994.

Career

Joining Testament and Slayer
In 1994, Dette received the opportunity to audition for thrash metal band Testament, following the departure of John Tempesta, who had left to join White Zombie. With the band, he performed the touring lineup for Low, going from September 1994 till 1995, recording Live at the Fillmore. In 1996, Dette auditioned for Slayer, following Paul Bostaph's departure from the band, a goal he had set since he was 17, and eventually got the opportunity to join the band. The initial offer had gone to Gene Hoglan who had just finished touring with Death, as he was a long time friend of the band, however, due to Dette's persistence and energy, they gave the gig to him. With the band, he performed consistently until 1997, when he was fired from the band due to a fallout with the members at the time, which led to Bostaph returning to the band. Following his departure from Slayer, he returned to Testament for the time being until he departed again. In 2000, he joined Testament once more, as a fill-in. In 2004, he joined the band HavocHate for the year.

Later career

In 2011, Dette received the call to fill-in for Heathen, a thrash metal band from California. Dette filled-in for Darren Minter, who was unable to make the tour with Destruction and Warbeast. In 2012, he released an album with the band Animetal USA with the album titled, Animetal USA W. Dette was then hired to play for Anthrax while Charlie Benante was forced to remain in the United States due to personal issues. He performed with the band on a European fall tour supporting Motörhead. Due to Benate's inability to leave the states, Dette was again asked to fill in for him on an Australian tour. While on the Australia tour with Anthrax, Dette received a call from Kerry King, inquiring if he could once again fill-in for Slayer, this time replacing Dave Lombardo, outright. Once the time with Slayer was up again, Heathen hired Dette to fill in once more for them for another European tour. Later that year, Iced Earth hired Dette to play with them, covering for Raphael Saini, who had previously filled in during a tour with Volbeat. The same year, Dette also formed Meshiaak with a friend named Danny Camilleri. Dette toured with Iced Earth until 2015 when Brent Smedley returned to the position. Dette was once again asked to fill in for Benante on an Anthrax tour the same year. Around this time, he was officially announced to have joined Impellitteri. With Impellitteri, he recorded Venom and The Nature of the Beast, before departing the band in 2018. In 2022, Dette was hired to fill-in for Jon Larsen of Volbeat after he tested positive for COVID-19.

Personal life
Dette claims he is not a religious person, but a spiritual one. Dette is an avid exerciser, to remain in shape for performing, as well as bringing supplements on tour, which earned him teasing from Anthrax and Slayer members. Dette is an avid Trump supporter.  Dette is left-handed.

Equipment
Dette uses Tama Drums and uses a Starclassic Bubinga in a Dark Cherry Fade.

Set-up
Drums:
22"x20" Bass Drum
22"x20" Bass Drum
14"x6.5" Snare Drum
12"x9" Tom Tom
13"x9" Tom Tom
16"x14" Floor Tom
18"x15" Floor Tom
Hardware:
Iron Cobra Power Glide Single Pedal (HP900P)
Iron Cobra Lever Glide Hi-Hat Stand (HH905)
1st Chair Wide-Rider Drum Throne (HT530)

Bands
Current
Animetal USA (2011–present)

Former
Apocalypse
Chaotic Realm
Evildead (1993-1994)
HavocHate (2004)
Impellitteri (2012-2018)
Killing Machine
Meshiaak (2013-2017)
Pushed
Slayer (1996-1997, 2013)
Temple of Brutality
Terror
Testament (1994-1995, 1997, 2000)

Live
Anthrax (2012-2013, 2015, 2017)
Heathen (2011, 2013)
Iced Earth (2013-2015)
Metal Machine
 Volbeat (2022)

Discography
AniMetal USA
Animetal USA W (2012)

Testament
Live at the Fillmore (1995)
Live at Dynamo Open Air 1997 (2019)

Evildead
Terror (1994)

Slayer
Soundtrack to the Apocalypse (2003)

Meshiaak
Alliance of Thieves (2016)

Impellitteri
Venom (2015)
Venom in Osaka (2015)
The Nature of the Beast (2018)

Heathen
Control By Chaos (Live At The Dynamo) (2020)

References

External links

YouTube
Jon Dette's thoughts on joining Slayer
Get to Know Slayer's New Drummer Jon Dette
Jon Dette Is Slayer's New Touring Drummer
What Means Expendable: The Strange Case of Jon Dette

Living people
1970 births
American drummers
American heavy metal drummers
Anthrax (American band) members
Iced Earth members
Impellitteri members
Slayer members
Testament (band) members